The P&M Explorer is a British ultralight trike that was designed and produced by P&M Aviation of Rochdale, Lancashire. Now out of production, when it was available it was supplied complete and ready-to-fly.

Design and development

The aircraft design features a strut-braced topless hang glider-style high-wing, weight-shift controls, a two-seats-in-tandem open cockpit with a cockpit fairing, tricycle landing gear with main gear wheel pants and a single engine in pusher configuration.

The aircraft is made from bolted-together aluminum tubing, with its double surface wing covered in Dacron sailcloth. Its  span wing is supported by struts and lacks a kingpost. It uses an "A" frame weight-shift control bar. The powerplant is a four cylinder, air and liquid-cooled, four-stroke, dual-ignition  Rotax 912ULS engine. Landing gear options include  wheels with 15X6 tyres, for operations on unimproved surfaces.

A number of different wings can be fitted to the basic carriage, including the range of Quik wings.

Specifications (Explorer)

References

PandM Explorer
2010s British sport aircraft
2010s British ultralight aircraft
Single-engined pusher aircraft
Ultralight trikes